Marko Gudurić (born 8 March 1995) is a Serbian professional basketball player for Fenerbahçe of the Turkish Basketball Super League (BSL) and the EuroLeague. He also represents the senior Serbian national basketball team internationally.

Professional career

Crvena zvezda (2013–2017)
Gudurić grew up with Crvena zvezda youth teams and signed his first professional contract in April 2013. He played two seasons for the Crvena zvezda development team FMP.

On September 30, 2015, Gudurić re-signed for Crvena zvezda to a four-year deal. On October 15, 2015, he made his EuroLeague debut against SIG Basket with 6 points, 4 assists, 3 rebounds, and 4 steals. One of his best moments was against Real Madrid when he had a crucial dunk to get Crvena zvezda +4 lead one minute before the end of the game on November 27, 2015. On December 18, 2015, Zvezda played a game against Bayern Munich for qualifying in TOP 16 of EuroLeague, Gudurić made some crazy 3-pointers and had 16 points in an amazing comeback win in front of crazy atmosphere in Pionir hall. On July 5, 2016, he made a 3-point buzzer-beater against their biggest rival Partizan in Game 2 of KLS Finals to secure Zvezda 2-0 lead and final result 86–87. 

Gudurić started his sophomore season in EuroLeague great with 21 points, 5 assists, and 4 rebounds to provide a win versus FC Barcelona Lassa in Round 3.

Fenerbahçe (2017–2019)
On July 14, 2017, Gudurić signed a four-year contract with Turkish club Fenerbahçe.

In the 2017–18 EuroLeague, Fenerbahçe made it to the 2018 EuroLeague Final Four, its fourth consecutive Final Four appearance. Eventually, they lost to Real Madrid with 80–85 in the final game. Over 36 EuroLeague games, he averaged 6.7 points, 1.6 rebounds and 1.9 assists per game, while also having very high shooting percentages.

In the 2018–19 EuroLeague season, Gudurić was among the most valuable roster pieces that brought Fenerbahçe to their 5th consecutive Final Four appearance. However, at the 2019 EuroLeague Final Four, Fenerbahçe lost in the semifinal game to their arch-rivals Anadolu Efes and later again in the 3rd place game to Real Madrid. Over the season, Gudurić averaged career-high 9.4 points and 2.2 assists per game while shooting 47.7% from the three-point field goal. In the end of the season, Fenerbahçe lost the Turkish League championship after being defeated with 4–3 in the Finals of 2019 BSL Playoffs to Anadolu Efes.

Memphis Grizzlies (2019–2020)
On July 31, 2019, Gudurić signed a multi-year contract with the Memphis Grizzlies. On October 23, 2019, Gudurić made his debut in NBA, coming off from the bench in a 101–120 loss to the Miami Heat with nine points, two rebounds and two assists. On January 30, 2020, Gudurić was suspended for one game without pay for leaving the bench during an altercation between the Grizzlies and the New York Knicks. On December 15, the Grizzlies waived him.

Return to Fenerbahçe (2020–present)
On December 18, 2020, Gudurić signed a contract with Fenerbahçe Beko until the end of the 2022–23 season. On March 4, 2023, he officially renewed his contract through 2026.

National team career

Gudurić represented Serbia at the EuroBasket 2017 where they won the silver medal, after losing in the final game to Slovenia.

At the 2019 FIBA Basketball World Cup, the national team of Serbia was dubbed as favorite to win the trophy, but was eventually upset in the quarterfinals by Argentina. With wins over the United States and Czech Republic, it finished in fifth place. Gudurić averaged 5.6 points, 1.1 rebounds and 1.1 assists over 7 tournament games.

Career statistics

NBA

Regular season

|-
| style="text-align:left;"| 
| style="text-align:left;"| Memphis
| 44 || 0 || 11.0 || .395 || .301 || .923 || 1.7 || 1.0 || .3 || .2 || 3.9
|- class="sortbottom"
| style="text-align:center;" colspan="2"| Career
| 44 || 0 || 11.0 || .395 || .301 || .923 || 1.7 || 1.0 || .3 || .2 || 3.9

EuroLeague

|-
| style="text-align:left;"| 2015–16
| style="text-align:left;" rowspan=2| Crvena zvezda
| 24 || 1 || 15.6 || .474 || .371 || .810 || 1.5 || 1.4 || .6 || .0 || 7.1 || 5.8
|-
| style="text-align:left;"| 2016–17
| 29 || 4 || 18.8 || .488|| .304 || .859 || 2.1 || 2.1 || .6 || .1 || 7.8 || 6.4
|-
| style="text-align:left;"| 2017–18
| style="text-align:left;" rowspan=4| Fenerbahçe
| style="background:#CFECEC;"|  36* || 17 || 15.6 || .654 || .446 || .875 || 1.6 || 1.9 || .7 || .0 || 6.7 || 7.2
|-
| style="text-align:left;"| 2018–19
| 36 || 18 || 22.1 || .629 || .477 || .843 || 1.9 || 2.2 || .9 || .2 || 9.4 || 10.2
|-
| style="text-align:left;"|2020–21
| 21 || 21 || 25.8 || .451 || .417 || .844 || 2.7 || 2.3 || .8 || .3 || 12.2 || 10.8
|-
| style="text-align:left;"|2021–22
| 28 || 10 || 20.3 || .422 || .362 || .817 || 2.2 || 2.8 || .8 || .1 || 10.2 || 9.8
|- class="sortbottom"
| style="text-align:center;" colspan=2| Career
| 174|| 71 || 19.4 || .469 || .398 || .839 || 2.0 || 2.1 || .7 || .1 || 8.7 || 8.3

See also 
 List of Serbian NBA players

References

External links

Marko Gudurić at aba-liga.com
Marko Gudurić at draftexpress.com
Marko Gudurić at eurobasket.com
Marko Gudurić at euroleague.net
Marko Gudurić at tblstat.net

1995 births
Living people
2019 FIBA Basketball World Cup players
ABA League players
Basketball League of Serbia players
Fenerbahçe men's basketball players
KK Crvena zvezda players
KK FMP players
Memphis Grizzlies players
Memphis Hustle players
National Basketball Association players from Serbia
People from Priboj
Serbia men's national basketball team players
Serbian expatriate basketball people in the United States
Serbian expatriate basketball people in Turkey
Serbian men's basketball players
Small forwards
Undrafted National Basketball Association players